Vedidkari is a village in Samegrelo-Zemo Svaneti province of Western Georgia. The village is located in 15 kilometers from Martvili. According to the data of 2014, 713 people live in the village of Vedidkari. A small Jewish community existed in the village since the second half of 18th century.

Notable people 
 Soviet World War II bomber pilot Colonel Varlam Urdia was born in Vedidkari.

References

Populated places in Samegrelo-Zemo Svaneti
Kutaisi Governorate